Chatfield High School may refer to:
 Chatfield High School (Colorado)
 Chatfield High School (Minnesota)